Crocus pulchellus, the hairy crocus, is a species of flowering plant in the genus Crocus of the family Iridaceae, found the Northern Balkan Peninsula to Northwestern Turkey.

It has gained the Royal Horticultural Society's Award of Garden Merit.

References

pulchellus
Plants described in 1841